*Hans Brask (1464–1538) was a Swedish Bishop of Linköping.

Biography

Brask was born in Linköping in 1464 to a bourgeois family. He studied philosophy and law at German universities, e.g. Rostock, and around 1500 he received a doctoral degree in civil and canon law from Rome. Upon his return to Sweden he first worked as canon and was later, in 1505, appointed cathedral dean in the cathedral of Linköping. He also became a member of the council of the realm (Privy Council of Sweden) and worked for a reconciliation with Denmark, with which Sweden has been at war for some years as part of the ongoing conflicts in the Kalmar Union. In 1513 he was appointed bishop in Linköping. Brask was opposed to Sten Sture's struggle with archbishop Gustav Trolle, but signed a document at the 1517 diet to remove the bishop. According to Olaus Petri's Swedish chronicles, Brask was forced to sign the document. Under his seal he is supposed to have put a note saying "" - "To this I am forced and compelled". This legend is the origin of a word in modern Swedish:  ("brask note"), meaning a hidden reservation. The word can have several other meanings, including explanation, excuse, warning, parenthesis, or question mark.

Brask supported the Danish king Christian II, but was not part of the events that led to the infamous massacre in Stockholm 1520. After Gustav Vasa's rebellion, he was forced to join the new king's side, but he would become an opponent of the king's politics. The events of 1527 diet in Västerås led to Brask fleeing the country to Poland.

Brask was an active man with many ideas. He was the first man to plan a canal between the two large Swedish lakes, Vänern and Vättern. He was running a printing house in Söderköping. The correspondence between Brask and others is an important source of history in a country where not much was written down.

Bishop Brask is believed to have died in Ląd (Swedish Landa) monastery (the Cistercian Trail, Poland) in 1538, where his tombstone is seen to this day.

External links 

 Entry on Hans Brask on catholic-hierarchy.org

References 

Bishops of Linköping
1464 births
1538 deaths
15th-century Swedish people
16th-century Roman Catholic bishops in Sweden